Xhemal Pasha Zogu (1860–1911), also known as Jamal Pasha or Jamal Pasha Zogolli, was the Hereditary Governor of Mati, Albania (at the time part of the Ottoman Empire). He was the father of King Zog I of Albania.

Born at Burgajet Castle, Mati (or Constantinople), in 1860, he was the third son of Xhelal Pasha Zogolli and Ruhije Alltuni, from the wealthy Alltuni family of Kavajë. He was educated privately and became Hereditary Governor of Mati upon the death of his older brother, Riza.

During the Great Eastern Crisis, a meeting held in Debar (1880) by Albanian notables deciding on the course of action regarding the Ottoman cessation of Ulcinj to Montenegro, Xhemal was in the pro-government group advocating no action be taken and was against a declaration of Albanian autonomy in the Balkans.

Xhemal married Zenja Malika Khanum (Melek Hanem) (Castle Burgajet, Mati, c. 1860 - Castle Burgajet, Mati, 1884), his cousin germain, in Mati in 1880; after she died in childbirth in 1884 he married Sadiya Khanum (Sadijé Hanem) in Mati in 1887. Her title was later changed to Nëna Mbretëreshë i Shqiptarëvet ("Queen Mother of the Albanians").

He became involved in an insurrection against the Ottomans planned for June 1903, which did not take place.

Sons
 Prince (Princ) Xhelal Bey Zogu (only child by first marriage)
A son by his second wife who died in infancy or young
Zog I of Albania

Daughters
Princess (Princeshë) Adilé
Princess (Princeshë) Nafisa
Princess (Princeshë) Senijé
Princess (Princeshë) Myzejen
Princess (Princeshë) Ruqiya
Princess (Princeshë) Majida

References

Bibliography
 Patrice Najbor, Histoire de l'Albanie et de sa maison royale (5 volumes), JePublie, Paris, 2008,.
 Patrice Najbor, la dynastye des Zogu, Textes & Prétextes, Paris, 2002

External links 
Maison royale d'Albanie, site officiel en langue française
Famille royale d'Albanie, site officiel en langue anglaise

1860 births
1911 deaths
People from Mat (municipality)
Albanian Sunni Muslims
Albanian Pashas
Xhemal
People from Scutari vilayet